Jocara venezuelensis is a species of snout moth. It is found in Venezuela.

References

Moths described in 1956
Jocara